The 2016 African Weightlifting Championships was held in Yaoundé, Cameroon between May 7 and May 13, 2016.

Medal summary
Results are obtained from the IWF website.

Men

Women

Participating nations 

 (13)
 (3)
 (4)
 (15)
 (3)
 (7)
 (8)
 (7)
 (13)

 (3)
 (7)
 (3)
 (15)
 (8)
 (2)
 (8)
 (5)
 (2)

References

External links
 Tournament website

African Weightlifting Championships
African Weightlifting Championships
International sports competitions hosted by Cameroon
Sport in Yaoundé
Weightlifting in Cameroon
Events in Yaoundé